January 20 - Eastern Orthodox liturgical calendar - January 22

All fixed commemorations below are observed on February 3 by Eastern Orthodox Churches on the Old Calendar.

For January 21st, Orthodox Churches on the Old Calendar commemorate the Saints listed on January 8.

Saints
 Martyrs Eugenios, Candidus, Valerianus, and Aquilas, at Trebizond (303)
 Virgin-martyr Agnes of Rome (ca. 304)
 Martyr Neophytus of Nicaea (305)
 The Holy Four Martyrs of Tyre, by the sword.
 Venerable Apollonios of the Thebaid, ascetic (4th century)  (see also: March 31)
 Venerable Maximus the Confessor (662)
 Martyr Anastasius (662), disciple of St. Maximus the Confessor.
 Saint Zosimas, Bishop of Syracuse (662)
 Martyrs Gabriel and Zionios, and companions, under the Bulgarian ruler Omurtag (ca. 814-831)

Pre-Schism Western saints
 Saint Publius, first Bishop of Malta and later Bishop of Athens, martyred under Trajan (ca. 112, or, ca. 161-180)  (see also: March 13 in the East)
 Saint Fructuosus, Bishop of Tarragoña in Spain, and Deacons Augurius and Eulogius (259)
 Martyr Patroclus of Troyes, under Aurelian (ca. 270-275)
 Saint Epiphanius of Pavia, Bishop of Pavia (496) 
 Saint Brigid (Briga), known as St Brigid of Kilbride, venerated around Lismore in Ireland (6th century)
 Saint Lawdog (6th century)
 Saint Vimin (Wynnin, Gwynnin), a Bishop in Scotland, said to have founded the monastery of Holywood (6th century)
 Saint Meinrad of Einsiedeln, hermit, martyred by robbers (861)
 Saint Maccallin (Macallan), Abbot of Saint-Michel-en-Thiérache Abbey and Waulsort (978)

Post-Schism Orthodox saints
 Saint Neophytus of Vatopedi monastery, Mt. Athos (14th century)(see also: January 20).
 Venerable Maximus the Greek of Russia (1556)
 Venerable Timon, monk (desert-dweller) of Nadeyev and Kostroma (1840)
 Saint George-John (Mkheidze) of Georgia (1960)

New martyrs and confessors
 New Hieromartyr Elias Berezovsky, Priest of Alma-Ata (1938)

Other commemorations
 Synaxis of All the Martyred Saints, from Protomartyr Stephen up to the present.
 Synaxis of the Church of Holy Peace (Saint Irene), by the Sea in Constantinople.

Icons
 "Paramythia" Icon of the Most Holy Theotokos  (Vatopedi Mother of Consolation, Mother of God of Vatopedi), at Vatopedi monastery, Mt. Athos (807)
 Icon of the Mother of God "Stabbed" (Greek: "Esphagmeni." Slavonic: "Zaklannaya"), at Vatopedi monastery (14th century)
 Icon of the Mother of God "Xenophon Hodigitria" (1730)

Icon gallery

Notes

References

Sources
 January 21 / February 3. Orthodox Calendar (PRAVOSLAVIE.RU).
 February 3 / January 21. HOLY TRINITY RUSSIAN ORTHODOX CHURCH (A parish of the Patriarchate of Moscow).
 January 21. OCA - The Lives of the Saints.
 The Autonomous Orthodox Metropolia of Western Europe and the Americas (ROCOR). St. Hilarion Calendar of Saints for the year of our Lord 2004. St. Hilarion Press (Austin, TX). p. 9.
 January 21. Latin Saints of the Orthodox Patriarchate of Rome.
 The Roman Martyrology. Transl. by the Archbishop of Baltimore. Last Edition, According to the Copy Printed at Rome in 1914. Revised Edition, with the Imprimatur of His Eminence Cardinal Gibbons. Baltimore: John Murphy Company, 1916. pp. 21–22.
 Rev. Richard Stanton. A Menology of England and Wales, or, Brief Memorials of the Ancient British and English Saints Arranged According to the Calendar, Together with the Martyrs of the 16th and 17th Centuries. London: Burns & Oates, 1892. pp. 28–31.
Greek Sources
 Great Synaxaristes:  21 ΙΑΝΟΥΑΡΙΟΥ. ΜΕΓΑΣ ΣΥΝΑΞΑΡΙΣΤΗΣ.
  Συναξαριστής. 21 Ιανουαρίου. ECCLESIA.GR. (H ΕΚΚΛΗΣΙΑ ΤΗΣ ΕΛΛΑΔΟΣ). 
Russian Sources
  3 февраля (21 января). Православная Энциклопедия под редакцией Патриарха Московского и всея Руси Кирилла (электронная версия). (Orthodox Encyclopedia - Pravenc.ru).
  21 января (ст.ст.) 3 февраля 2013 (нов. ст.). Русская Православная Церковь Отдел внешних церковных связей. (DECR).

January in the Eastern Orthodox calendar